Ceryx macgregori is a moth of the  subfamily Arctiinae. It was described by Schultze in 1900. It is found on the Philippines.

References

Ceryx (moth)
Moths described in 1900